Michael Peart may refer to:

Michael Peart (politician), Jamaican politician
Michael Peart (judge) (born 1953), Irish judge